Boris Andreyevich Vilkitsky (22 March (3 April N.S.) 1885, Pulkovo – 6 March 1961) was a Russian hydrographer and surveyor. He was the son of Andrey Ippolitovich Vilkitsky.

Career

Born in Pulkovo, Tsarskoselsky Uyezd (now part of Saint Petersburg), Vilkitsky graduated from the Naval Academy in Saint Petersburg in 1908. He participated in the Russo-Japanese War of 1904–1905. In 1913—1915 he led the Arctic hydrographic expedition on the ships "Taimyr" and "Vaigach" with the purpose of further exploration of the Northern Sea Route.

In 1913, Vilkitsky's expedition discovered Emperor Nicholas II Land (Zemlya Imperatora Nikolaya II) —later renamed 'Severnaya Zemlya', perhaps one of the most important Russian discoveries in the Arctic at the time. Other discoveries were an island that now bears his name (Vilkitsky Island), as well as the islands of Maly Taymyr and neighboring Starokadomsky. In 1914–1915, Vilkitsky's expedition made the first through voyage from Vladivostok to Arkhangelsk, discovered Novopashenniy Island (now Zhokhov Island), and described the eastern coastline of the territory he named 'Emperor Nicholas II Land'. He was awarded the prestigious Constantine Medal by the Russian Geographical Society for his endeavours. 

In 1918, Vilkitsky was appointed head of the first Soviet hydrographic expedition, which never took place due to its seizure by the interventionists in Arkhangelsk. In 1920, Vilkitsky emigrated to Britain. In 1923 and 1924, Vilkitsky led commercial expeditions in the Kara Sea at the invitation of the Soviet foreign trade organizations.

Later in his life, Vilkitsky was employed as a hydrographer in the Belgian Congo.
Boris Vilkitsky died in Brussels in 1961.

Memory

Many geographical features in Russia bear Vilkitsky's name:
 The most well-known one is Vilkitsky Strait, the strait between Severnaya Zemlya and Taimyr Peninsula, an important landmark of the Northern Sea Route.
 Zaliv Vil'kitskogo, a bay in the NW shores of Novaya Zemlya.
 Vilkitsky Island in the Kara Sea.
 The Vilkitsky Islands, a division of the Nordenskjold Archipelago.
 The Vilkitsky Islands subgroup of the Komsomolskaya Pravda Islands in the Laptev sea off the eastern shores of the Taymyr Peninsula.
 Vilkitsky Island in the De Long Group in the Eastern Siberian Sea.

See also
 Russian Hydrographic Service

References

Sources

 The Arctic Personalities at poseidonexpeditions.com

1885 births
1961 deaths
Engineers from Saint Petersburg
People from Tsarskoselsky Uyezd
Russian people of Belarusian descent
Explorers from Saint Petersburg
Russian and Soviet polar explorers
Russian hydrographers
Explorers of Asia
Explorers of the Arctic
Explorers of Siberia
Severnaya Zemlya
Belgian Congo people
Russian military personnel of World War I
White movement people